James Campbell Pitman, Lord Pitman LLD (1864–1941) was a 20th-century Scottish law lord who served as a Senator of the College of Justice.

Life
He was born at 11 Alva Street in Edinburgh the son of Frederick Pitman WS.

In 1900 he is listed as an advocate living at 13 Great Stuart Street in the Moray Estate in west Edinburgh.

In 1911 he is listed as an advocate living at 9 Doune Terrace in the Moray Estate in west Edinburgh.

From 1920 to 1929 he was Sheriff of Caithness. In January 1929 he was elected a Senator of the College of Justice under the title of Lord Pitman.

Following his death in the Spring of 1939 he was replaced as a Senator by William Donald Patrick, Lord Patrick.

References

1864 births
1941 deaths
Senators of the College of Justice
Lawyers from Edinburgh